These are the candidates and winners of the municipal elections in the province of Quebec, in Canada, held November 5 2006.

Candidates alone were elected without opposition. Winners are in bold.

Port-Cartier
Turnout: 2394 voters out of 5109 electors (46,8%)
Mayor:
Jean Pierre Boudreau
Laurence Méthot Losier
Councillor 1: Roger Chenard
Councillor 2: Henriette Lapierre
Councillor 3: Gilles Fournier
Councillor 4:
 Carole Chevarie (Without opposition)
 Yvon St-Gelais (Desisted)
Councillor 5: Mary Corbey
Councillor 6: Jean-Marc Bacon

Sept-Îles
Turnout: 8086 voters out of 20278 electors (39,9%)
Mayor:
Charles-Henri Desrosiers
Andrée-Gurthy Dufour
Ghislain Levesque
District of Clarke:
Myreille Bernatchez
Gervais Gagné
District of Ferland:
Maurice Gagné
Alain Lapierre
District of L'Anse:
Lorraine Bourgoin
Jean Masse
District of Vieux-Poste:
Ghislain Fournier
Sylvie Levesque
Denis Miousse
District of Vigneault:
Gaby Gauthier
Rodrigue Vigneault
District of Monseigneur Blanche: Lorraine Dubuc-Johnson
District of Sainte-Famille: Martial Lévesque
District of Rive:
Frédéric Décoste
Serge Lévesque
District of Gallix: Guylaine Lejeune
District of Moisie:
Claude Lessard
Rolland Smith

Thetford Mines
Turnout: 11842 voters out of 21213 electors (55,8%)
Mayor:
Luc Berthold
Normand Laliberté
Councillor 1:
Clément Boudreau
Rosaire Lessard
Councillor 2:
Marcel Chalifoux
Normand Fortier
Renaud Legendre
Michel Marceau
Councillor 3:
Ghyslain Cliche
Charles Nadeau
Councillor 4:
Luc Champagne
Georges-Henri Cloutier
Councillor 5: Carmen Jalbert Jacques
Councillor 6:
Denise Bergeron
Louis-Philippe Champagne
Councillor 7:
Robert Bourret
Marco Tanguay
Councillor 8: Marc F. Vachon
Councillor 9:
Paul-André Marchand
Marc Vachon
Councillor 10: Gaétan Vachon

2006
Quebec, municipal
Municipal elections